Hot Blood is a 1956 American CinemaScope Technicolor musical film starring Jane Russell and Cornel Wilde and directed by Nicholas Ray.

Plot
Marco Torino, king of the gypsies in southern California, is terminally ill. He wants his younger brother to succeed him, but Stephano is determined to become a dancer instead.

After turning a potential employer against him, Marco arranges a marriage for his brother to Annie Caldash, another gypsy. Stephano angers Annie's father Theodore and brother Xano by resisting Annie's charms and refusing to marry her, as he loves Velma.

Annie comes up with a scheme. Her father wants her to be paid a rich dowry from Stephano's family, then run off before the marriage. Stephano's brother is trying to raise money for a trip to "the promised land." She persuades Stephano to stage a phony wedding at which she will faint during the ceremony, whereupon they will split the dowry and teach their greedy relatives a lesson. But it is Stephano whom she ends up fooling, by going through with the marriage.

An angry Stephano leaves with Velma, finding work in cheap dance clubs. He begins to miss Annie. He returns to the gypsy camp to find Marco and her together, surprisingly happy. Mistakenly believing they are now together and pulling a swindle, Stephano objects, but Marco explains that he is merely enjoying the last precious days of his life. Stephano agrees to become the new gypsy king, with Annie his queen.

Cast
 Jane Russell as Annie Caldash
 Cornel Wilde as Stephano Torino
 Luther Adler as Marco Torino
 Joseph Calleia as Papa Theodore
 James H. Russell as Xano 
 Nina Koshetz as Nita Johnny
 Helen Westcott as Velma
 Mikhail Rasumny as Old Johnny
 Wally Russell as Bimbo
 unbilled players include Richard Deacon and Robert Foulk, and Ross Bagdasarian and Les Baxter appear uncredited as gas station attendants

Background 
The film's working title was Tambourine. Jean Evans was the pen name of Jean Abrams, Ray's first wife. In 1949, Ray himself wrote a treatment based on Evans' research on gypsies in New York City's Lower East Side for RKO. In 1951, Ray worked on a script called No Return with writer Walter Newman about urban gypsies. Columbia finally agreed to make the film, but insisted that the script be re-written. Ray then worked with Jesse Lasky, Jr. as his writer on a new screenplay which became Hot Blood. Ray had wanted producer Gabriel Pascal to play "Marco Torino," the King of the Gypsies, but Pascal died before the film was made. According to modern sources, Ray also considered Edward G. Robinson for the role, which eventually was portrayed by Luther Adler, a veteran of the Group Theater. Modern sources also add that choreographer Matt Mattox substituted for Cornel Wilde during the dances.

References

External links 
 
 
 
 

1956 films
1956 drama films
American musical drama films
Columbia Pictures films
Films directed by Nicholas Ray
Films scored by Les Baxter
Films set in Los Angeles
Fictional representations of Romani people
1950s English-language films
1950s American films
1950s musical drama films